The Goodpaster River is an  major tributary of the Tanana River in the U.S. state of Alaska. Its name in the Middle Tanana dialect of the Lower Tanana language is Jiiz Cheeg. Goodpaster River is a stream located just 6.6 miles from Big Delta, in Southeast Fairbanks Census Area.

The older glacial record in the Yukon-Tanana upland is found in the Goodpaster River Valley where records of at least three older glaciations are found, the oldest estimated to be Late Tertiary.

The structure of the Goodpaster River Bridge consists of six 21-m simple spans.

Naming 
The stream was called Goodpaster River by Lieutenant Allen "in honor of the Goodpaster family of Kentucky." The two stream names were transposed by later map makers. Alternate names for this stream includes North Fork Goodpaster River and Volkmar River.

Natives 
The area of Goodpaster River and Big Delta, Delta River (incl. Delta Junction and Deltana) is homeland of the Delta-Goodpaster or Big Delta-Goodpaster band of the Middle Tanana of the Tanana Athabaskans. The Goodpaster River to be a natural break in the Tanana Athabaskan language area, separating upriver speakers of the Tanacross and Upper Tanana languages from the Lower (and Middle) Tanana speakers living farther downriver.

Fishing
The Goodpaster is accessible only by boat; launch points are at the Tanana River near Delta Junction or Clearwater Lake).

Mining 
Only a few thousand ounces of gold from placer mines, and a few hundred ounces from lode gold mines were produced from the Goodpaster district before the discovery of Pogo. The district is east of the Fairbanks and south of the Circle district. The Pogo mine, is located in the Goodpaster River Valley.

See also
List of rivers of Alaska

References

External links
GOOGLE Maps : Goodpaster River

Alaska Range
Rivers of Alaska
Rivers of Southeast Fairbanks Census Area, Alaska
Rivers of Unorganized Borough, Alaska
Tanana Athabaskans
Tributaries of the Yukon River